Taylor Jensen (born 1984, Lake Tahoe) is an American professional longboard surfrider.

Pro career
He won his first two World Longboard Championship titles in a row in 2011 & 2012 and won his third world title in 2017.

Jensen is a 6x North American Champion and a 3x Australasia Champion. He is also the two time US Open of Longboarding champion winning his first  title in 2003. In 2006, he took the U.S. Pro Longboarding Championship Tour.  In 2007, he finished runners-up to Colin McPhillips at the U.S. Open of Surfing. But, he reclaimed the title in 2008..

Other Titles
 2012,2014,2015,2016 ASP LQS 3-Star Australian Open of Longboarding Champion.
 2012 ASP LQS 1-Star Hyundai Pro Sandy Bay Champion.
 2011 ASP LQS 1-Star Malfunction Surf Festival & ASP Australasia LQS NSW Title.
 2010, 2009 Noosa Festival of Surfing champion.
 2009 PLA and Gidget PLA Pros.
 2008 Costa Del Mar Pro Champion.

References

External links
 firewire Team rider Profile
 Longboard Event Champions

American surfers
1984 births
Living people
Sportspeople from Oceanside, California
World Surf League surfers